Rod Sandberg (born c. 1969) is an American football coach and former player. He is the head football coach at Whitworth University in Spokane, Washington, a position he has held since the 2014 season.

Sandberg played college football as a defensive back at Wheaton College in Wheaton, Illinois from 1987 to 1990. He began his coaching career in 1991 as an assistant at Aurora University in Aurora, Illinois and spent 1993 and 1994 as an assistant coach at Georgetown College in Georgetown, Kentucky. Sandberg returned to Wheaton in 1995 as linebackers coach and was promoted to defensive coordinator in 2003.

Sandberg was hired by Whitworth in December 2013 to succeed John Tully as head football coach. He was selected over Chris Tormey, who had been the head football coach at University of Idaho and the University of Nevada, and John Sala, the head football coach at Louisburg College, a junior college in Louisburg, North Carolina.

Head coaching record

References

External links
 Whitworth profile

1960s births
Year of birth missing (living people)
Living people
American football defensive backs
Aurora Spartans football coaches
Georgetown Tigers football coaches
Wheaton Thunder football coaches
Wheaton Thunder football players
Whitworth Pirates football coaches